Ashigara Station may refer to:
Ashigara Station (Kanagawa) in Kanagawa Prefecture, Japan served by the Odakyu Odawara Line.
Ashigara Station (Shizuoka) in Shizuoka Prefecture, Japan served by the JR Gotemba Line.